Herbert M. Sauro works in the field of metabolic control analysis and systems biology.

Education and early life
Sauro was born July 19, 1960 in Dyfed, Wales. He grew up in the village of Llangolman in Pembrokeshire and attended the Welsh comprehensive school Ysgol y Preseli.

Education 

After obtaining a B.Sc. in biochemistry with microbiology at the University of Canterbury and an M.Sc. in biological computing at the University of York, Sauro moved to Oxford Brookes University for his Ph.D. (1986) under the direction of David Fell, for a thesis entitled Control analysis and simulation of metabolism, work that led to several publications, including one in which new relationships between elasticities and control coefficients were described. Subsequently he obtained a teaching degree at the University of Aberystwyth.

Research 

Sauro carried out post-doctoral research at the University of Edinburgh in association with Henrik Kacser, when he worked on time-dependent systems and enzyme-enzyme interactions.

While a student at Oxford Sauro wrote a program called SCAMP for modelling metabolic systems, later developed as Jarnac and incorporated in his Systems Biology Workbench.

Together with Hamid Bolouri, Andrew Finney and Michael Hucka he was a member of the development team for the creation of SBML (the Systems Biology Mark-up language),
which has become a major influence on the subject.

In 2018, Sauro's research group published Tellurium, a Python-based modeling environment with applications in system analysis and synthetic biology.

Books 

Sauro is the author of books on metabolic control analysis, enzyme kinetics, and Laplace transforms.

Career 

After some years, first at Caltech (2000-2005), then at the Keck Graduate Institute in Claremont, California (2004-2007), Sauro moved to the University of Washington as an Associate professor in the department of Bioengineering in 2007. In 2013 he earned the University of Washington College of Engineering, Community of Innovators Awards, Faculty Innovator: Teaching & Learning.

He is currently the director of the NIH Center for Reproducible Biomedical Modeling.

References

Systems biologists
Theoretical biologists
Biochemists
Living people
1960 births